Kiriwina-Goodenough District is a district of the Milne Bay Province of Papua New Guinea.  Its capital is Kiriwina.  The population of the district was 63,916 at the 2011 census.

References

Districts of Papua New Guinea
Milne Bay Province